Vahlen is a German surname. Notable people with the surname include:

Johannes Vahlen (1830–1911), German philologist
Theodor Vahlen (1869–1945), German mathematician, son of Johannes

See also
Valen (surname)

German-language surnames